Aqua Teen Hunger Force Forever (or shortened as Aqua Teen Forever) is the alternative title given to the eleventh season of the animated television series, Aqua Teen Hunger Force. Originally the final season, it aired in the United States on Cartoon Network's late night programming block, Adult Swim. It premiered on June 21, 2015, with "Mouth Quest" and ended with "The Greatest Story Ever Told" on August 30, 2015, with a total of nine episodes. The show is about the surreal adventures and antics of three anthropomorphic fast food items: Master Shake, Frylock, and Meatwad, who live together as roommates and frequently interact with their human next-door neighbor, Carl Brutananadilewski. In late January 2016, this season became available on Hulu Plus. 

Episodes in this season were written and directed by Dave Willis and Matt Maiellaro. The theme music, entitled "We Rule Your Animated Comedy Ass Forever", was written and performed by the three main cast members alongside Michael Kohler. Almost every episode in this season featured a special guest appearance, which continues a practice used in past seasons. This season has been released in various forms of home media, including on demand streaming.

Production
Episodes in this season were written and directed by series creators Dave Willis and Matt Maiellaro, who have both written and directed every episode of the series. Episodes in this season aired in the United States on Cartoon Network's late night programming block Adult Swim.

An episode entitled "Laser Cowboy" was written for this season but was never produced, as Adult Swim did not think it would work. The episode was to be entirely live action, and did not actually feature any of the main characters. The episode was to be as if the main characters were watching a completely different show on Carl's Roku box, with the episode itself being an episode of the show.

Dave Willis first announced that this will be the final season on April 25, 2015 at a C2CE convention panel. He stated that the series was cancelled, and it wasn't his decision to end it. Willis and Maiellaro first learned about the cancellation from people from the animation studio, halfway through the production of this season. Willis mentioned on Reddit that Adult Swim president Mike Lazzo made the decision to end the series because "he was ready to move on from it".

In 2017, Adult Swim was asked why they don't make more episodes, to which they responded "we might" with a bump. Willis also expressed interest in doing a Kickstarter to fund Death Fighter, a scrapped sequel to Aqua Teen Hunger Force Colon Movie Film for Theaters. The series was announced to have been renewed for a five episode 12th season in 2023.

Cast

In season eleven the main cast consists of Dana Snyder as the voice of Master Shake, Carey Means as the voice of Frylock, and series co-creator Dave Willis as the voice of both Meatwad and Carl Brutananadilewski.

Episodes

Home release

This season is available in HD and SD for digital purchase on iTunes, Google Play, Amazon Video, and Microsoft.

See also
 Alternative titles for Aqua Teen Hunger Force
 List of Aqua Teen Hunger Force episodes

References

External links

 Aqua Teen Hunger Force at Adult Swim
 Aqua Teen Hunger Force season 11 at the Internet Movie Database

2015 American television seasons
Aqua Teen Hunger Force seasons